90th Sustainment Brigade is a United States Army Reserve Sustainment Brigade which is split between the states of Arkansas, Oklahoma and Texas.

History

Units

The brigade is made up of the following units:
 Headquarters and Headquarters Detachment 
 46th Detachment (Technical Manager B)
 112th Detachment (Technical Manager A) 
 315th Quartermaster Team (Petrol Liaison) 
 316th Quartermaster Battalion (Petrol)
 Headquarters and Headquarters Detachment
 883d Quartermaster Company (Petrol Support) 
 910th Quartermaster Company (Petrol Support) 
 327th Transportation Detachment (Movement Control) (Area) 
 418th Transportation Detachment (Trailer Transfer Platoon)
 481st Transportation Detachment (Movement Control) (Area) 
 600th Transportation Detachment (Trailer Transfer Platoon)
 348th Transportation Battalion (Terminal)
 Headquarters and Headquarters Detachment 
 217th Transportation Company (Combat Heavy Equipment Transporter) 
 453d Transportation Company (Cargo Transfer) (Improved Cargo Handling Operations) 
 644th Transportation Company (Medium Truck) (Palletized Load System)
 31st Transportation Detachment (Trailer Transfer Platoon) 
 651st Transportation Detachment (Harbormaster)

References

Sustainment Brigades of the United States Army